The history of delay-tolerant networking examines the bulk of the technologies that began the field that is known today as delay-tolerant networking. Research began as projects under United States government grants relating to the necessity of networking technologies that can sustain the significant delays and packet corruption of space travel. Initially, these projects looked only short-range communication between manned missions to the moon and back, but the field quickly expanded into an entire sub-field of DTNs that created the technological advances to allow for the Interplanetary Internet.

In the 1970s, spurred by the micronization of computing, researchers began developing technology for routing between non-fixed locations of computers. While the field of ad hoc routing was inactive throughout the 1980s, the widespread use of wireless protocols reinvigorated the field in the 1990s as mobile ad hoc routing and vehicular ad hoc networking became areas of increasing interest.

With the growing interest in mobile ad hoc routing and the increasing complexity of the Interplanetary Internet, the 2000s (decade) brought about a growing number of academic conferences on delay and disruption-tolerant networking. This field saw many optimizations on classic ad hoc and delay-tolerant networking algorithms and began to examine factors such as security, reliability, verifiability, and other areas of research that are well understood in traditional computer networking.

Early research efforts
One of the first known references of the study of interplanetary communication comes in 1954 with the development of the Sputnik 1 satellite by the Soviet Union when Mikhail Tikhonravov emphasized that an artificial satellite is an inevitable stage in the development of rocket equipment, after which interplanetary communication would become possible. With the successful launch of Sputnik 1 in 1957, the United States entered into the Sputnik crisis and, more generally, the Space Race with the Soviet Union.

One of the direct results of the Sputnik crisis was the creation of the Advanced Research Projects Agency (ARPA), known today as Defense Advanced Research Projects Agency or DARPA. At this time, computers were making the transition from a vacuum tube-based architecture to a transistors architecture, where computers were evolving into general purpose machines. To spur research in areas relating to the feasibility of human space flight, ARPA issued a numerous government grants to both academic institution and industries to research technical details of communication between Earth and an orbiting satellite.

With the increased understanding of how to communicate with an orbiting satellite, the concept of contact points began to become a key focus in the research in space communication. The key idea behind a contact point is that there is only a set duration of time where both the source and the receiver points are able to communicate with one another. The concept of contact points was generalized further in later work to involve more complex interactions, such as planets, stars, or moons blocking the communication path between two points.

With the exclusion of Earth-based communication to space, there was little research in the 1980s and early 1990s in communication with the presence of a delay or disruption. With the micronization of computers, the 1990s brought about the fields of mobile ad hoc routing and vehicular ad hoc networking as areas of increased interest.

Mobile Ad Hoc Networking (MANET) research

With the widespread use of 802.11 protocols for personal communications and the expanded use of mobile phones, there was a significant increase in self-organizing wireless ad hoc networking and network devices. This area of research focused on topics ranging from low-level physical transmission of signal (CDMA, CSMA, TDMA, and others) all the way to high-level protocol details (optimization of TCP for MANETs).

Unified research at delay-tolerant networking

In the 2000s (decade), many of the concepts seen in used in the early stages of the interplanetary communication and the developments made during the 1990s in MANETs were combined and used to develop and deploy a complete networking on satellites orbiting numerous planets. This network, often referred to as the Interplanetary Internet, has helped to unify the research of MANETs and traditional interplanetary communication into a common area of delay-tolerant networking.

References

Network architecture